Turp may refer to:

 Turp, Iran, a village in Rudqat Rural District, Sufian District, Shabestar County, East Azerbaijan Province
 André Turp (1925-1991), Canadian tenor
 Daniel Turp (born 1955), professor of constitutional and international law at the Université de Montréal
 TURP, Transurethral resection of the prostate

See also
 Turps (disambiguation)
 Terp (disambiguation)